Peter Rajah (1951 – 14 November 2014) was a Malaysian footballer who played as a goalkeeper for Sabah and the national team.

Rajah was a member of the Malaysian team who qualified for the 1980 Moscow Olympics, which Malaysia did not participate in boycott of the Soviet invasion of Afghanistan.  He also part of Malaysia squad in the 1980 AFC Asian Cup in Kuwait.

Honours 
Sabah
 Malaysian League Tournament runner-up: 1979

 Borneo Cup: 1972, 1977, 1978, 1979, 1980, 1984, 1985

References 

1951 births
2014 deaths
Malaysian footballers
Malaysia international footballers
1980 AFC Asian Cup players
Sabah F.C. (Malaysia) players
Association football goalkeepers